Putative neutrophil cytosol factor 1C is a protein that in humans is encoded by the NCF1C gene. It relates to a type of white blood cell called a neutrophil. The Neutrophil Cytosolic Factor 1C (NCF1C) gene is responsible for encoding the 47 kDA cytosolic subunit of NADPH oxidase. The NCF1C gene is located near two pseudogenes and when the NCF1C gene recombines with them, the NCF1C gene will inactivate and can lead to chronic granulomatous disease.

References

Further reading 

 
 

Human proteins